The women's 12.5 km mass start competition of the 2015 Winter Universiade was held at the Sporting Centre FIS Štrbské Pleso on January 31.

Results

References 

Women's 12.5km
2015 in Slovak women's sport